Procyanidin B4 is a B type proanthocyanidin.

Procyanidin-B4 is a catechin-(4α→8)-epicatechin dimer. It is found in the litchi pericarp, in grape seeds, and, along with 4-cis-isomer of procyanidin B4, in beer.

See also 
 Phenolic content in wine

References 

Procyanidin dimers